Cementerio de la Chacarita in Buenos Aires, Argentina, is known as the National Cemetery and is the largest in Argentina.

Location
The cemetery is in the barrio or district of Chacarita, in the western part of Buenos Aires. Its main entrance is on Avenida Guzmán.

History
The cemetery owes its existence to a yellow fever epidemic in 1871, when existing cemeteries were strained beyond capacity (the upscale La Recoleta Cemetery refused to allow the burial of victims of the epidemic). Students of the College of San Carlos appropriated  in the adjoining Colegiales area for this purpose, but had their facility closed by the city in 1886. The New Chacarita Cemetery began to function in 1887 and was formally designated as such in 1896.

Chacarita Cemetery has designated areas for members of the Argentine artistic community, including writers, prominent composers and actors. The late Justicialist leader and former President Juan Perón was buried here until his remains were relocated in 2006 to a mausoleum in his former home in San Vicente.

British and German Cemeteries 

In the 19th century a large number of Britons came to Argentina to work in the many areas of the economy in which England then had extensive interests. At first the British Cemetery was founded beside the Socorro Chapel (started 1821 - authorized on 22 February 1822). In 1833 the cemetery had to move to what was then called Victoria Cemetery (today the "Plaza 1° de Mayo") until November, 1892, when they were asked by the Municipality to move. Section 16 of the Chacarita Cemetery was given in exchange for the Victoria Cemetery. Eventually in 1913 the Cementerio Británico (or so called "De Disidentes or Corporación del Cementerio Británico de Bs. As.") was divided into the German and the British cemeteries as we know them today, because the two local communities had grown since the beginning of the 19th century.

The British Cemetery and the German Cemetery are today not managed by or part of Chacarita Cemetery.

Notable interments

La Chacarita Cemetery
Notable burials in La Chacarita cemetery include:

British Cemetery

 Lucas Bridges (1874–1949), Anglo-Argentine author
 Thomas Bridges (1842–1898), Anglican missionary
 Frank Brown (1858–1943), popular English clown
 Jeannette Campbell (1916–2003), swimmer
 Cecilia Grierson (1859–1934), physician and feminist
 Alexander Watson Hutton (1853–1936), founder of Argentine Soccer
 Juan Bautista Thorne (1807–1885), Army Colonel

German Cemetery
 Hans Langsdorff (1894–1939), Captain of the World War II pocket battleship 
 Friedrich Bergius (1884–1949), Nobel Prize in Chemistry
 Annemarie Heinrich (1912–2005), photographer

References

External links 

 La Chacarita Cemetery cultural historical heritage rescue webpage by Hernán Santiago Vizzari 
 Google Maps
 British Cemetery Corporation of Buenos Aires by Eduardo A. Kesting  
 

Cemeteries in Buenos Aires
 
1887 establishments in Argentina
Cemeteries established in the 1880s